"The Way We Weren't" is the twentieth episode of the fifteenth season of the American animated television series The Simpsons. It originally aired on the Fox network in the United States on May 9, 2004.

Plot
Bart and Milhouse steal and empty a bottle of Homer's Duff Beer to play spin the bottle with neighborhood girls. Homer interrupts the game and is accidentally kissed by Milhouse. The Simpson family holds a mock trial to determine Bart's guilt, with Lisa presiding as judge. Bart doubts that Homer had never kissed a girl as a 10-year-old, but Marge proudly states that Homer's first kiss was with her in high school. Homer confesses that it was not his first kiss, but that he met a girl at summer camp.

Homer recalls that when he was Bart's age, he went to a camp for underprivileged boys, Camp See-A-Tree, where he met Lenny, Carl, and Moe. The campers were forced to work in the kitchen of the neighboring girls' camp, Camp Land-A-Man. Homer found a retainer left behind on one of the trays and returned it to its owner using the dumbwaiter. Through the wall, the girl asked Homer to see her later that night, but before he could make it, he accidentally stabbed himself in the eye with a switchblade knife, and had to wear an eyepatch to the date. Marge surprises the family by revealing that the girl in question was actually her, and if she had known, she would never have married Homer.

Marge gives her side of the story. She attended Camp Land-A-Man alongside her sisters Patty and Selma, Helen Lovejoy, Luann Van Houten and Cookie Kwan. She fell for the boy who returns her retainer, but, embarrassed by his real name, Homer gave the false name "Elvis Jagger Abdul-Jabbar". While ironing her hair for the date, Marge accidentally burned it, and became a "brunette" for the evening. She and Homer met and shared a passionate kiss. They parted ways after Homer gave Marge a heart-shaped rock, agreeing to meet again the following night. However, "Elvis" never showed up for the planned second date, and as a result, Marge was unable to trust another boy for years.

Homer explains why he did not show up. Right after the date, he was so dazed with bliss that he accidentally fell off a cliff into the lake and drifted to a fat camp, Camp Flab-Away, which counts a younger Mayor Quimby, Chief Wiggum and Comic Book Guy as its campers. He was caught by the Camp Instructor, who mistook him for a camper. Meanwhile, a devastated Marge decided to leave the camp and threw the rock that he had given her away, breaking it in two. Homer managed to escape the fat camp and make his way to Marge's camp, but she had already left.

Despite knowing the truth, Marge is unable to let the heartache go after nursing it for so long. However, Homer proves that he really did care about her for years after the date by showing her a piece of the broken rock that he had found. Pleasantly surprised, Marge reveals that she had kept the other piece (albeit for the very different reason of reminding her of the cruel things men can do) and forgets about the past. The two then put the rock together to form a heart and share a passionate kiss.

Cultural references
The episode title refers to the 1973 film The Way We Were. Similarly, the twelfth episode of Season 2 was titled "The Way We Was". The camps See-A-Tree and Land-A-Man are an apparent homage to the 1960s sitcom Camp Runamuck which focused on a camp for unprivileged kids and another quite different camp for girls. When Homer needs to cross the river to meet Marge for their date, Homer looks between the water and a nearby rowboat, and states "Hmmm... It's row versus wade... and it's my right to choose."

Near the end when Homer is rummaging through his memory box, he finds a letter from his "old pen pal". Then he says: "Someday, I'll write you back, Osama". When Homer shows Marge his half of the heart, he says he put it next to his IBM stock—ing. The Sea Captain sings a verse from the 1958 Kingston Trio song "Tom Dooley". It also contains a hit song by The Turtles entitled "Happy Together" which later appears in The Simpsons Movie. In her flashback, Marge tells Homer during their date that she likes Parliament, but not Funkadelic, a reference to the fact that they were both fronted by funk musician George Clinton. The scene which depicts Homer and his friends escaping by bicycle from a landing jet plane is a loose reference to a similar situation involving teenage Art Zuke during the events of the Gimli Glider incident in 1983.

Reception

This episode was nominated for an Emmy in the Outstanding Animated Program (for programming less than one hour) selection.

This episode was watched by 6.2 million people in its original airing.

In his review of the Kiss and Tell DVD, Andy Dougan of the Evening Times characterized the episode as one of the "funniest episodes of recent series".

References

The Simpsons (season 15) episodes
Summer camps in television
2004 American television episodes